Photobucket is an American image hosting and video hosting website, web services suite, and online community. Photobucket hosts more than 10 billion images from 100 million registered members. Photobucket's headquarters are in Denver, Colorado. The website was founded in 2003 by Alex Welch and Darren Crystal and received funding from Trinity Ventures. It was acquired by Fox Interactive Media in 2007. In December 2009, Fox's parent company, News Corp, sold Photobucket to Seattle mobile imaging startup Ontela. Ontela then renamed itself Photobucket Inc. and continues to operate as Photobucket.

Photobucket is widely used for both personal and business purposes. Links from personal Photobucket accounts are often used for avatars displayed on Internet forums, storage of videos, embedding on blogs, and distribution in social networks. Images hosted on Photobucket are frequently linked to online businesses, online auctions, and classified advertisement websites like eBay and Craigslist.

In late June 2017, Photobucket dropped its free hosting service, and started requiring a US$99 annual subscription to allow external linking to all hosted images, or a US$399 annual subscription to allow the embedding of images on third-party websites, such as personal blogs and forums. This policy change, enacted with minimal advance notice, has been highly controversial. As a result, users who previously relied on Photobucket to freely host content embedded on forums, blogs, and websites must either pay the annual subscription (previously there was no charge), or switch to another 3rd party server (many of which are also shutting down or going to pay services; Tinypic, which remained free under Photobucket ownership, was shut down in 2019) and recreate every link (potentially thousands) for every photo previously linked to Photobucket, or have their photos replaced with an account upgrade notice.

In 2018, Photobucket moved to offering plans ranging from $5.99 to $12.99 a month, along with discounted annual rates.

History
Photobucket was founded in 2003 by Alex Welch and Darren Crystal and received funding from Trinity Ventures. It was acquired by Fox Interactive Media in 2007.

In December 2009, Fox's parent company, News Corp, sold Photobucket to Seattle mobile imaging startup Ontela. Ontela then renamed itself Photobucket Inc. and continues to operate as Photobucket.

On June 28, 2017, Photobucket changed its Terms of Use regarding free accounts and third party hosting (hosting on forums, eBay, etc.). Only the most expensive plan, at US$399.99 per year, permitted third party hosting and linking to forums.

This new business model has caused thousands of forum DIY's and write-ups with explanatory pictures to be rendered useless. About 500 words into the linked document was a declaration that free accounts would no longer permit image-linking to third-party sites. eBay and Etsy have also been affected, in addition to many forums and blogs. Thousands of images promoting goods sold on Amazon and other shopping sites had been removed after the photo-sharing service changed its terms, causing a great deal of controversy.

On May 17, 2018, Photobucket restored all of their 3rd party hosted images and introduced new plans, including US$24.99/year that included 3rd party hosted images.

In 2019, they introduced two plans that include 3rd party hosted images, US$29.99/year with 2 GB or US$69.99/year with 20 GB. Effective June 1, 2019, free Photobucket and the  "beginner" paid plan accounts were restricted to a hosting bandwidth of 25 MB per month. Free accounts who use more than 25 MB of bandwidth will have all of their hosted photos watermarked and blurred.

Ratings and reviews
On September 13, 2017, Denver Better Business Bureau gave the company an "F" rating, the worst they issue, citing fifteen complaints related to the change in terms and no response from the company.

Twitter partnership
In 2011, Twitter announced that Photobucket would be the default photo sharing platform for Twitter. At that time, according to a report by Sysomos, 2.25M images were shared on Twitter daily, which accounted for 1.25% of all Tweets posted.

Features

Accounts
Photobucket offers subscription based accounts.

The following describes Photobucket subscription pricing as of January 6, 2023:
 Free 7-day trial, Unlimited
 25  GB Lite account US $5.99/mo or $64.69/yr
 250 GB Plus account (+Hosting) US $7.99/mo or $86.29/yr
 Unlimited account (+Unlimited Hosting) US $12.99/mo or $140.29/yr

Videos
Photobucket supports video uploads of 500 MB or less, and 10 minutes or less. The following video file types are supported: 3g2, 3gp, 3gp2, 3gpp, avi, divx, flv, gif, mov, mp4, mpeg4, mpg4, mpeg, mpg, m4v, and wmv. All video files are converted to mp4 format after uploading.

Sharing

The service allows sharing of photos, videos, and albums by email, instant messaging, mobile phone, and social media.

Photobucket stories
On November 15, 2012, Photobucket announced the availability of "Photobucket Stories" which provides users with an easy new way to combine
photos, videos, and text into complete, sharable narratives. Photobucket Stories allows users to easily create and collaborate on living stories by inviting friends and family to contribute photos, video and text to a single, sharable canvas. Once Stories are created, they are easily embeddable on blogs, personal, and brand sites, and can be shared among friends from mobile devices or across Facebook, Twitter and
other social networks.

Editing
On February 6, 2013 Photobucket announced a partnership with Aviary, an image editing application suite.

Privacy
Photobucket has three privacy options for albums: public, private, and password-protected privacy.

Public
When an album is public:
 Photos and videos that have tags, titles, or descriptions display in Photobucket search results when someone searches for the terms in the tags, titles, or descriptions. NA as of March 18, 2013
 Photos in the album may appear in other search engines like Google or Bing.
 Users can follow linked photos on other sites back to albums and browse other photos in the album. NA as of March 18, 2013
 Photos recently uploaded to the album appear on Profile page. NA as of March 18, 2013
 Images will appear on the Photobucket Community page. NA as of March 18, 2013

Private
When an album is private:
 Photos and videos in the album do not display in Photobucket search results.
 Account followers will not see photos uploaded to the album.
 Images uploaded to the album will not display on the user Profile page.

Password-protected privacy
When an album is password-protected:
 Users enter the password in order to view the album.
 If someone searches for a username, they cannot access password-protected albums unless they have a guest password.
 Content will not display in search results.

Censorship policy
Since Photobucket does not allow sexually explicit or objectionable content, they may remove content at their discretion due to violations of their terms of service.

Fuskering
Although it is possible to set Photobucket albums to "private", this does not prevent the photos within being accessed by someone who knows or can guess the URL. Programs called fuskers exist, which can test for likely photo URLs. This has led to "private" photos on Photobucket being downloaded and distributed elsewhere on the Internet without the consent of their uploaders.

Photobucket monitors suspicious activity to track for possible fuskers. Photobucket has advised users to scramble the links to their photos and videos, and that the option to scramble the links of both past and future uploads should be selected if there is no need to preserve the original file names.

Criticism
Photobucket announced a change to its Terms of Service on June 26, 2017, requiring a US$399 per year subscription fee for those who want to hotlink images from Photobucket's servers to display on other sites, a service it had previously offered free. This change resulted in vast numbers of photos online being replaced with a graphic advising users to upgrade their account. Photobucket has received extensive criticism in response, with many charging the company with "blackmail" or "extortion", and destroying the design of many websites. In March 2018, under the guidance of new CEO Ted Leonard, plans initially ranging from US$1.99 to US$8.99 monthly based on storage size replaced the flat-rate model. Prices later jumped to a range from US$4.48 to US$11.48 monthly for those same usage increments.

The criticism is reflected on ratings across various online reviews - resulting in an average of 1.2 stars out of 5 across two popular review websites. It has also resulted in an "F" rating on the Better Business Bureau page.

See also
 Comparison of video services
 Flickr
 Imgur
 List of online video platforms
 List of photo sharing websites

References

External links
 

Companies based in Seattle
American companies established in 2003
Image-sharing websites
Former News Corporation subsidiaries
American photography websites
2003 establishments in Washington (state)